Aspen Valley High School is a grade 9 to 12 public alternative high school within Academy School District 20 in Colorado Springs, Colorado in the United States.

See also 
 Academy School District 20

References

External links 
 
 Academy School District 20

High schools in Colorado Springs, Colorado
Public high schools in Colorado